Yudda Bhoomi is a 1988 Telugu action film directed by K. Raghavendra Rao starring Chiranjeevi in the lead role opposite Vijayashanti with Mohan Babu, Murali Mohan, Nutan Prasad and Allu Rama Lingaiah playing other important roles. Bollywood actor Shakti Kapoor in his second Telugu film essayed an antagonistic role alongside Mohan Babu

Plot
An army officer comes to his village for a vacation, but seeing the bad state of his village, he stands up against the atrocities that people face because of the evil landlord.

Cast 
Chiranjeevi
Vijayashanti
Shakti Kapoor
Mohan Babu
Murali Mohan
Nutan Prasad
Allu Rama Lingaiah

Soundtrack

References

External links 
 

1980s Telugu-language films
Indian action drama films
1988 films
Films scored by K. Chakravarthy
Films directed by K. Raghavendra Rao